= Darlington Akogo =

Ghanaian businessman (born 1995)

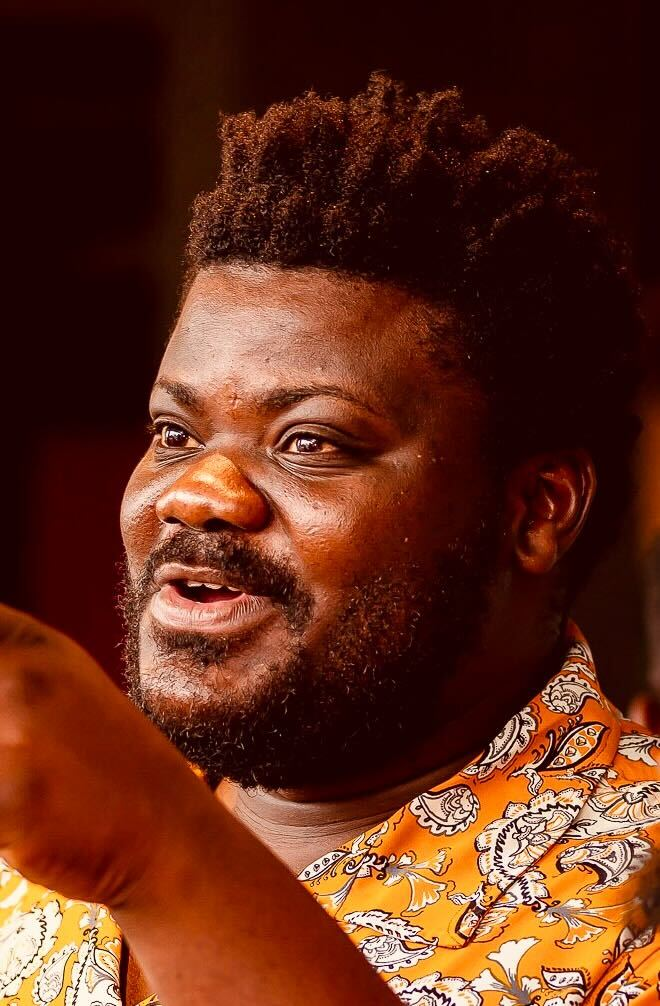
Darlington Akogo, Founder and Chief Executive Officer of Minohealth AI labs

Darlington Akogo (born December 6, 1995) is the founder and chief executive officer of Minohealth AI labs, an artificial intelligence for healthcare applications, and Kara Agro AI, an AI-based agriculture platform.

== Early life ==
Akogo was born in Ghana but started his company in Europe and returned to Ghana in 2017.

== Career ==
His interest in AI was born of the challenges he faced in accessing healthcare in 2013. In 2016, he began considering using AI to address barriers to healthcare. Since then, he has designed several AI technologies used in radiology. This technology has been deployed by more than 50 countries.

== Speaking engagements and international work ==
Akogo has served as a speaker on AI and health on platforms such as the World Health Organization and the International Telecommunication Union. He also received funding from the Melinda Gates Foundation to start Moremi AI, an AI medical diagnostic assistant. He was also invited to Bill Gates's home to discuss AI.

See Also: Brian Muhumuza Bishanga

== Awards and recognition ==
- In 2023, Akogo was named to the MIPAD Global Top 100 Most Influential People of African Descent list.
- In 2025, he was named to the Forbes Africa 30 Under 30 list for his contributions to health technology and artificial intelligence.
